Dasydytidae is a family of gastrotrichs in the order Chaetonotida.

Genera
Anacanthoderma Marcolongo, 1910
Chitonodytes Remane, 1936
Dasydytes Gosse, 1851
Haltidytes Remane, 1936
Ornamentula Kisielewski, 1991
Setopus Grünspan, 1908
Stylochaeta Hlava, 1904

References

Gastrotricha
Platyzoa families